The Parable of the Tree and its Fruits is a parable of Jesus which appears in two similar passages in the New Testament, in the Sermon on the Mount in Matthew's Gospel and the Sermon on the Plain in Luke's Gospel.

From  (KJV):
"Beware of false prophets, which come to you in sheep's clothing, but inwardly they are ravening wolves. Ye shall know them by their fruit. Do men gather grapes of thorns, or figs of thistles? Even so every good tree bringeth forth good fruit; but a corrupt tree bringeth forth evil fruit. A good tree cannot bring forth evil fruit, neither can a corrupt tree bring forth good fruit. Every tree that bringeth not forth good fruit is hewn down, and cast into the fire. Wherefore by their fruits ye shall know them."

From  (KJV):
"For a good tree bringeth not forth corrupt fruit; neither doth a corrupt tree bring forth good fruit. For every tree is known by his own fruit. For of thorns men do not gather figs, nor of a bramble bush gather they grapes. A good man out of the good treasure of his heart bringeth forth that which is good; and an evil man out of the evil treasure of his heart bringeth forth that which is evil: for of the abundance of the heart his mouth speaketh."

In contrast, the Fruit of the Spirit is holy and will be evident in the life of a true prophet.

In Matthew's Gospel the context relates to testing a prophet. In Luke's Gospel the connection is less obvious. Scottish minister William Robertson Nicoll suggests that "the thread is probably to be found in the word ὑποκριτά, hypokrita, applied to one who by his censoriousness claims to be saintly, yet in reality is a greater sinner than those he blames".

See also
 Papyrus Oxyrhynchus 210
 The Vine
 Fruit of the Holy Spirit
 Gamaliel's principle

References

External links
 The Parables of Jesus: The Tree and its Fruits

Gospel of Matthew
Doctrines and teachings of Jesus
Sermon on the Mount
Trees in Christianity